The Obsidian Conspiracy is the seventh and final studio album by American heavy metal band Nevermore. It was released on June 8, 2010 in North America by Century Media and at the end of May in Europe. The band's previous album, This Godless Endeavor, was released in 2005, making the five-year gap the longest between two consecutive Nevermore albums. 

The Obsidian Conspiracy was met with generally positive reviews. It was the band's first album to chart in Austria, Belgium, the United Kingdom, and the United States Billboard 200. The band went on an indefinite hiatus following the departure of guitarist Jeff Loomis and drummer Van Williams in mid-2011, subsequently the death of frontman Warrel Dane in 2017 ended any possibility of a reunion, making The Obsidian Conspiracy the last studio recording by Nevermore.

Writing and recording
Nevermore, having written 13 new songs, entered Wichers studio, North Carolina in August 2009 to record the album. Van Williams completed recording the drumming on the album as August 17, in Seattle. The whole recording process was finished in October.

Warrel Dane commented on the writing process: "These songs are full of newfound rage, lyrically and musically. Jeff Loomis has come up with some amazing new riffs that will no doubt please old and new fans alike. Also, I think the combination of Peter and Andy (production & mixing) will result in something very, very special."

Jeff Loomis commented on the writing of the album: "I think that with the new Nevermore, it still sounds like the band, but I think I'm giving Warrel a little bit more room this time around for more vocals rather than all the notey, kind of complex stuff and all that, so this time around it's just a little bit more wide open musically for him to really be able to do whatever he wants vocally this time around. So we'll see what happens. It's gonna be an interesting album for us, for sure."

Loomis has also stated in a recent interview that Peter Wichers had a major part in the songwriting, encouraging Loomis to "cut out the fat, and make the songs catchier and hookier", thus creating a simplistic and stripped down sound that differs from the original 7–8 minute complex tracks which Loomis originally wanted to record.

Track listing

Personnel

Nevermore 
Warrel Dane – lead vocals
Jeff Loomis – lead guitar
Jim Sheppard – bass
Van Williams – drums

Production 
Peter Wichers – production, engineering
Andy Sneap – mixing, mastering
Travis Smith – cover art

Chart positions

Release history

References

External links
Nevermore's official website

2010 albums
Nevermore albums
Century Media Records albums
Albums with cover art by Travis Smith (artist)